The 2019 Iowa 300 was the twelfth round of the 2019 IndyCar Series season, contested over 300 laps at the 0.875-mile (1.4 km) Iowa Speedway in Newton, Iowa. Simon Pagenaud claimed his third pole position of the season, while Josef Newgarden went on to win his 4th race of the season and 14th of his career.

Results

Qualifying

Race

Notes:
 Points include 1 point for leading at least 1 lap during a race, an additional 2 points for leading the most race laps, and 1 point for Pole Position.

Championship standings after the race

Drivers' Championship standings

Manufacturer standings

 Note: Only the top five positions are included.

References

Iowa Corn Indy 300
Iowa 300
Iowa 300
Iowa 300